Horizontal escalation is the process by which conflicts are heightened through geographical expansion with reasoning including diplomatic, economic, informational, and military components. This also includes international intervention as well as the geographical widening of combat operations. Horizontal escalation is a direct contrast to vertical escalation which employs types of weapons not previously used in the conflict. That type of escalation also allows attacking new types of targets in order to have an upper hand to the other combatant. During the Cold War, the risks associated with using escalation were much broader and more diverse, due to the intensity of the current world events. Counterinsurgency and counter-terrorist operations were very prone to using horizontal escalation as a means of defense. Those two types of warfare are more likely to lead to horizontal escalation, because the area of conflict widens in efforts to eliminate enemy holdings or to punish other parties that support their enemy. In an era of such high intensity, in order to gain an upper hand, horizontal escalation was implemented.

Examples
Due to an unclear division between different types of escalation, some attacks can be classified as horizontal, vertical, or both.
 In 1942, the United States dropped bombs during the Doolittle Raid in Japan. When the United States dropped those bombs, they were able to force the Japanese military to allocate resources away from the front lines and back into its home territory.
 In 1980, the Reagan administration entertained the idea of using horizontal escalation in Western Europe when they threatened the integrity of the Warsaw Pact. By using horizontal escalation, they would avoid using nuclear weapons—a means of vertical escalation.
 In 1991, with the launching of Iraqi Scud missiles into Israel. This is devised to bait the Israelis to go to war with them, however, the United States ensured that Israel would not join the war. The conflict ended without the need of an escalatory response.

See also 
 Conflict escalation

References 

Conflict (process)